Osteochilichthys is a small genus of cyprinid fishes. It is endemic to southern India.

Species
There are two species:
 Osteochilichthys brevidorsalis (Day, 1873) — Kantaka barb (Tamil Nadu, Kerala)
 Osteochilichthys thomassi (Day, 1877) — Konti barb (Karnataka, Kerala, Andhra Pradesh)
  Osteochilichthys elegans, (Plamoottil, 2022)- Plamoottil's Barb (Palakkad, Kerala)
  Osteochilichthys formosus,  (Plamoottil & Vineeth, 2022)-The Charming Barb (Kazargod, Kerala)

References

 
Cyprinidae genera
Cyprinid fish of Asia

Endemic fauna of India